In Irish mythology, the goddess Airmed (also given as Airmid) was one of the Tuatha Dé Danann.  With her father Dian Cecht and brother Miach, she healed those injured in the Second Battle of Magh Tuiredh.

After her jealous father slew her brother, Miach, Airmed wept over her brother's grave. Watered by her tears, all the healing herbs of the world (365 in number - according to the number of Miach's joints and veins) sprung from the earth over Miach's body, and Airmed collected and organized them all, spreading them on her cloak. Once again, their father lashed out, and scattered the herbs. For this reason, no living human knows all the secrets of herbalism. Only Airmed remembers.

Along with Dian Cecht, Ochtriullach, and Miach, Airmed was one of the enchanters whose incantation sung over the well of Sláine and was able to resurrect the dead.

References

Irish goddesses
Mythological cycle
Tuatha Dé Danann
Health goddesses
Life-death-rebirth goddesses